Scunthorpe Rugby Club is an English rugby union team based in Scunthorpe, Lincolnshire. The club runs six senior sides, a ladies team, a colts and under 18s team and a full set of junior teams.  The club currently plays in Regional North 1 East following the restructure of the leagues by the RFU at the end of the 2021–22 season.

History
Scunthorpe Rugby Club was formed in 1929 and played its first fixtures in a field owned by a local farmer, on the condition that the goal posts were moved after each game so that the animals could return to graze. From these humble beginnings the club progressed to a stage whereby it was able to move to its own ground, Heslam Park, in 1952.<ref>

Honours
 Notts, Lincs & Derbyshire 1 champions: 1988–89
 Midlands East 1 champions: 1994–95
 Midlands 1 East champions (2): 1995–96, 2009–10
 Midlands Premier champions (3): 2000–01, 2015–16, 2018–19

Notes

References

External links
 Official club website

English rugby union teams
Rugby clubs established in 1929
Rugby union in Lincolnshire
Sport in Scunthorpe